Attila Császár may refer to:

Attila Császár (kayaker) (1958–2017), Hungarian kayaker
Attila Császár (footballer) (born 1984), Hungarian footballer